The 2002–03 Ukrainian Hockey League season was the 10th season of the Ukrainian Hockey League. Fourteen teams participated in the league, and HC Sokil Kyiv won the championship.

First round

Division A

Division B

Group A

Group B

Placing round

7th place 
 Gladiator Lviv - Sumski Vorony Sumy 22:3

5th place
 Meteor Dnipropetrovsk II - Soniachna Dolyna Odessa

3rd place
 HK Dnipro Kherson - HK Smila 12:6

Final 
 Khimik Severdonetsk - Meteor Dnipropetrovsk 8:5

Playoffs

Pre-Playoffs 
 Barvinok Kharkiv - Khimik Severdonetsk 2:0

Semifinals
 HK ATEK Kyiv - Druzhba-78 Kharkiv 2:0
 HK Kyiv - Barvinok Kharkiv 1:2

Qualification 
 HK ATEK Kyiv - Barvinok Kharkiv 1:2

Final 
 HC Sokil Kyiv - Barvinok Kharkiv 2:0

External links
Ukrainian Ice Hockey Federation 

UKHL
Ukrainian Hockey Championship seasons
Ukr
2003 in Ukrainian sport